Mostafa Al-Abbad (Arabic: مصطفى العباد; born 14 October 1989) is a football player who currently plays for Al-Omran as a goalkeeper .

External links
 

1989 births
Living people
Saudi Arabian footballers
Al-Qarah FC players
Al Jeel Club players
Hajer FC players
Al-Thoqbah Club players
Al-Shurooq SC players
Al-Rawdhah Club players
Al Omran Club players
Saudi First Division League players
Saudi Professional League players
Saudi Second Division players
Saudi Fourth Division players
Saudi Third Division players
Association football goalkeepers
Saudi Arabian Shia Muslims